Kukuljani is a village in the Primorje-Gorski Kotar County, Croatia. Administratively it belongs to the municipality of Jelenje.

Population

References 

Populated places in Primorje-Gorski Kotar County